Mohab Samer (born 6 June 1995) is an Egyptian sabre fencer. He competed in the 2020 Summer Olympics.

References

1995 births
Living people
Sportspeople from Cairo
Fencers at the 2020 Summer Olympics
Egyptian male sabre fencers
Olympic fencers of Egypt
African Games medalists in fencing
African Games gold medalists for Egypt
African Games bronze medalists for Egypt
Competitors at the 2019 African Games
20th-century Egyptian people
21st-century Egyptian people